Indigenismo is a political ideology in several Latin American countries which emphasizes the relationship between the nation state and indigenous nations and indigenous peoples. In some contemporary uses, it refers to the pursuit of greater social and political inclusion for indigenous peoples in Latin America, whether through nation-wide reforms or region-wide alliances. In either case, this type of indigenismo seeks to vindicate indigenous cultural and linguistic difference, assert indigenous rights, and seek recognition and in some cases compensation for past wrongdoings of the colonial and republican states. Nevertheless, some historical figures like José Martí are classified as having been both indigenistas and hispanistas.

Indigenismo in Mexico

Originally, indigenismo was a component of Mexican nationalism that consolidated after the Mexican Revolution. This indigenismo lauded some aspects of indigenous cultural heritage, but primarily as a relic of the past. Within the larger national narrative of the Mexican nation as the product of European and Amerindian mestizaje, indigenismo was a component of Mexican nation-building, and an expression of freedom for an imagined, reclaimed identity that was stripped during the Spanish colonization of Mexico.

During the administration of Plutarco Elías Calles (1924–28), Moisés Sáenz, who held a doctorate from Columbia University and was a follower of John Dewey's educational methods, implemented aspects of indigenismo in the Department of Public Education. Sáenz had initially taken an assimilationist position on the "Indian problem," but after a period of residence in the Purépecha community of Carapan, he shifted his stance to one focusing on the material conditions affecting the indigenous. He influenced the administration of Lázaro Cárdenas (1934–40), which established the cabinet-level position of the Department of Indigenous Affairs in 1936. The department's main efforts were in the economic and educational spheres. Cárdenas valorized indigeneity, as indicated by the creation of the cabinet-level position and resources put into indigenous communities. In 1940, Mexico hosted a multinational meeting on indigenismo, The Congress of Inter-American Indigenism, held in Pátzcuaro, where Cárdenas himself addressed the gathering. President Miguel Alemán reorganized the Mexican government's policies directed at the indigenous by creating the National Indigenist Institute (Instituto Nacional Indigenista or INI). In the Vicente Fox administration, the unit was reorganized and renamed.

The valorization of indigeneity was rarely carried over to contemporary indigenous people, who were targeted for assimilation into modern Mexican society. Though the authors of indigenist policies saw themselves as seeking to protect and relieve indigenous people, their efforts did not make a clean break from forced assimilation practices of the pre-revolutionary past.

Indigenismo in Peru

In Peru, it was initially associated with the APRA movement founded by Víctor Raúl Haya de la Torre (1924). The then left-wing APRA dominated Peruvian politics for decades as the singular well-organized political party in Peru not centered on one person. To some APRA or "Aprismo" in its initial form stood for the nationalization of foreign-owned enterprises and an end to the exploitation of the indigenous peoples. To others it was about the combining of modern economics and technology with the historical traditions of the countryside and indigenous populations to create a new and unique model for social and economic development.

Ethnocacerism is an ethnic nationalist indigenous political movement in Peru associated with Antauro Humala, brother of ex-president Ollanta Humala with whom he carried out the Andahuaylazo, a failed coup d'état.

References

Further reading
 Barnet-Sánchez, Holly. "Indigenismo and Pre-Hispanic Revivals" in The Oxford Encyclopedia of Mesoamerican Culture. vol. 2, pp. 42–44. Oxford University Press 2001.
Baud, Michiel (2009). Indigenous peoples, civil society, and the neo-liberal state in Latin America. New York: Berghahn Books. pp. 19–42. .
Bonfil Batalla, Guillermo (1996). México profundo : reclaiming a civilization / by Guillermo Bonfil Batalla ; translated by Philip A. Dennis. Austin, TX: University of Texas Press. .
 Brading, D.A. "Manuel Gamio and Official Indigenismo in Mexico" Bulletin of Latin American Research 7.1 (1988), 75–89.
Coronado, Jorge (2009). Andes Imagined : Indigenismo, Society, and Modernity. Pittsburgh, PA: University of Pittsburgh Press. .
Dawson, Alexander (May 1998). "From Models for the Nation to Model Citizens: Indigenismo and the 'Revindication' of the Mexican Indian, 1920-40". Journal of Latin American Studies. 30 (2): 279–308.
Garcia, Maria Elena (2005). Making indigenous citizens: identities, education, and multicultural development in Peru. Stanford, California: Stanford University Press. .
 Knight, Alan, “Racism, Revolution, and Indigenismo," in The Idea of Race in the Latin America, 1870-1940, edited by Richard Graham, University of Texas Press, 1990.
Lewis, Stephen E. (2005). The ambivalent revolution: forging state and nation in Chiapas, 1910–1945. Albuquerque: University of New Mexico Press. .
Lopez, Rick Anthony (2010). Crafting Mexico: intellectuals, artisans, and the state after the Revolution. Durham, NC: Duke University Press. .
Munoz, Maria L. O.; Kiddle, Amelia (2010). Populism in twentieth century Mexico: the presidencies of Lázaro Cárdenas and Luis Echeverría. Tucson: University of Arizona Press. .
Postero, Nancy Grey; Zamosc, Leon (2004). The struggle for indigenous rights in Latin America. Brighton [England]; Portland, Or.: Sussex Academic Press. .
Saldivar, Emiko (April 1, 2011). "Everyday Practices of Indigensimo: An Ethnography of Anthropology and the State in Mexico". The Journal of Latin American and Caribbean Anthropology. 16 (1): 67–89. doi:10.1111/j.1935-4940.2011.01125.x.

Indigenous nationalism in the Americas
Indigenous peoples of the Americas
Indigenous politics
Mexican nationalism
Political movements in Mexico
Political movements in Peru
Human rights in Latin America